Basra Eyalet was an eyalet of the Ottoman Empire. It had a Defterdar and Kehiya of the Chavushes but neither Alai-beg nor Cheribashi because there were no ziamets or Timars, the lands being all rented by the governor.

History
Basra had formerly a hereditary government (mulkiat), but it was reduced to an ordinary eyalet when conquered by Sultan Mehmed IV. In 1534, when the Ottomans captured Baghdad, Rashid al-Mughamis, the Bedouin emir who then controlled Basra, submitted to Ottomans. Basra became an Ottoman province in 1538, and an Ottoman governor was appointed by 1546. The eyalet was later subordinated to Baghdad during the Mamluk dynasty of Iraq, and was separated from Baghdad again from 1850 to 1862.

See also
 Safavid occupation of Basra (1697–1701)

References

Eyalets of the Ottoman Empire in Asia
Ottoman Iraq
1538 establishments in the Ottoman Empire
1862 disestablishments in the Ottoman Empire